San Saba County is a county located on the Edwards Plateau in western Central Texas, United States. As of the 2020 census, its population was 5,730. Its county seat is San Saba. The county is named after the San Saba River, which flows through the county.

History

Early history
Early Native American inhabitants of the area included Tonkawa, Caddo, Apache, and Comanche. In 1732, Governor of Spanish Texas, Juan Antonio Bustillo y Ceballos, arrived on the feast day of sixth-century monk St. Sabbas, and named the river Río de San Sabá de las Nueces. Santa Cruz de San Sabá Mission was established in 1757. In 1788, José Mares led an expedition from San Antonio to Santa Fe.

In 1828, 28 people from Stephen F. Austin's group passed through. A portion of the county was included in Austin's grants from the Mexican government.  The Fisher–Miller Land Grant in 1842 contained most of later land deeds. Five years later, the Meusebach–Comanche Treaty was signed in San Saba County. In 1854, the Harkey family settled at Wallace and Richland Creeks. The David Matsler family moved from Burnet County to Cherokee Creek.

San Saba County was organized from Bexar County and named for the San Saba River in 1856. San Saba was selected as the county seat.  The Seventh Texas Legislature confirmed the boundaries of the county in 1858. in 1860, the population was 913, which included 98 slaves. The county was divided into 10 school districts in 1867.

In 1874, Edmund E. Risen devoted his work to improving local nuts, in particular the pecan.  San Saba eventually billed itself as the Pecan Capital of the World.

Post-Civil War history
In the 1880s-'90s, mob rule not only whipped and forced out numerous people in towns throughout Texas, but also took 140 lives in Texas following the Civil War. San Saba County had the worst of the violence, with 25 lives taken by lynching from 1880 to 1896. Mob killings in Texas in the years after the war were often racially motivated crimes committed by members of the Ku Klux Klan against suspected slave rebels and white abolitionists. An investigation led to the Texas Rangers restoring order. United Confederate Veterans organized a chapter known as the "William P. Rogers Camp" in San Saba County after the death in 1889 of Confederate President Jefferson Davis. Rogers, a hero of the Battle of Corinth in Mississippi, was a native of Georgia. He did not live in San Saba, but his daughter, Fannie, married one of Rogers' officers, George Harris, who moved there in 1880. A former county judge, Harris served as a commander of Rogers Camp, named for his father-in-law. The veterans' organization lasted until the early 1930s.

During the 1880s, a vigilante mob, organized like a fraternal lodge, killed a number of San Saba County settlers. In 1896, the Texas Rangers began an investigation. Uluth M. Sanderson, editor of the San Saba County News, ran editorials against the mob. Ultimately, the mob was broken by the Ranger Captain Bill McDonald and District Attorney W.C. Linder. Many of the mob executions committed throughout Texas in the time following the Civil War were racially motivated and often committed by members of the Ku Klux Klan (KKK), which formed in Shelby County, Texas. Most of the people killed by vigilante mobs in the five years after the war were "suspected slave rebels and white abolitionists". Although the KKK in Texas was less active by the 1870s, lives continued to be taken each year. In 1885, for the state of Texas, "...an estimated 22 mobs lynched 43 people, including 19 blacks and 24 whites, one of whom was female". "The San Saba County lynchers, the deadliest of the lot, claimed some 25 victims between 1880 and 1896. Vigilante lynching died out in the 1890s, but other varieties of mobs continued."

The San Saba Male and Female Academy was founded in 1882.  In 1889, the United Confederate Veterans William P. Rogers Camp No. 322 was established, named for Col. William P. Rogers.  West Texas Normal and Business College was organized by Francis Marion Behrns in 1885.

Late 19th and 20th centuries
The parallel-wire suspension Beveridge Bridge was built across the San Saba River in 1896 by Flinn, Moyer Bridge Co. In 1911, the Lometa-Eden branch of the Gulf, Colorado, and Santa Fe Railway was built through San Saba County.  San Saba County brick and sandstone courthouse is erected.  Architect Chamberlin & Co.
In 1930, half of the county farms were tenant farmed.  Uncle Billy Gibbons gave the Boy Scouts of America  a 99-year lease to campgrounds along Brady Creek on his ranch. The 1938 San Saba River floods caused county-wide devastation. One-third of the town of San Saba was under water. The Town of San  Saba was incorporated in 1940.  Prolonged drought in the mid-1950s brought hardship to the county agricultural economy.

The San Saba County News merged with the San Saba Star in 1960. In 1965, a historical marker was erected to honor pioneer doctor Edward D. Doss.

Geography

Major highways
  U.S. Highway 190
  State Highway 16
  Farm to Market Road 45

Adjacent counties
 Mills County (north)
 Lampasas County (east)
 Burnet County (southeast)
 Llano County (south)
 Mason County (southwest)
 McCulloch County (west)
 Brown County (northwest)

Demographics

Note: the US Census treats Hispanic/Latino as an ethnic category. This table excludes Latinos from the racial categories and assigns them to a separate category. Hispanics/Latinos can be of any race.

As of the census of 2010, 6,131 people, 2,289 households, and 1,616 families resided in the county.  The population density was 6 people per square mile (2/km2).  The 2,951 housing units averaged 3 per square mile (1/km2).  The racial makeup of the county was 84.50% White, 2.73% Black or African American, 1.07% Native American, 0.11% Asian, 10.52% from other races, and 1.07% from two or more races.  About 21.6% of the population was Hispanic or Latino of any race.

Of the 2,289 households, 29.10% had children under the age of 18 living with them, 58.90% were married couples living together, 8.40% had a female householder with no husband present, and 29.40% were not families. About 27.5% of all households were made up of individuals, and 15.90% had someone living alone who was 65 years of age or older.  The average household size was 2.45 and the average family size was 2.97.

In the county, the population was distributed as 27.90% under the age of 18, 8.20% from 18 to 24, 20.80% from 25 to 44, 22.80% from 45 to 64, and 20.30% who were 65 years of age or older.  The median age was 39 years. For every 100 females, there were 107.40 males.  For every 100 females age 18 and over, there were 97.10 males.

The median income for a household in the county was $30,104, and for a family was $35,255. Males had a median income of $25,334 versus $20,111 for females. The per capita income for the county was $15,309.  About 13.30% of families and 16.60% of the population were below the poverty line, including 24.50% of those under age 18 and 11.60% of those age 65 or over.

Attractions
San Saba County is home to the only suspension bridge open to traffic in the state; the Regency Bridge spanning the Colorado River, located off FM 500 in the northern part of the county, was built in 1939.

The Beveridge Bridge, built in 1896 spanning the San Saba River, was the only other suspension bridge in Texas open to traffic until 2004, when it was replaced by a concrete bridge. The Beveridge Bridge, since restored and open as a pedestrian bridge, is located on the northwest edge of the city of San Saba, on China Creek Road, just north of the Wedding Oak.

San Saba County has produced more Texas six-man football state championships than any other county in Texas. The towns of Richland Springs (Richland Springs Coyotes) and Cherokee (Cherokee Indians) have won a total of 11 state championships. Richland Springs has appeared in a total of 9 state championship games and has won eight of them (2004, 2006, 2007, 2010, 2011, 2012, 2015, 2016). Cherokee has appeared in a total of four state championship games and has won three of them (1973, 1975, 1978).

Communities

Towns
 Richland Springs
 San Saba (county seat)

Unincorporated communities
 Algerita
 Bend (partly in Lampasas County)
 Bowser
 Chappel
 Cherokee
 Elm Grove
 Hall
 Harkeyville
 Locker
 McMillan
 Skeeterville
 Sloan
 Spring Creek

Notable people
Actor Tommy Lee Jones was born in San Saba and owns a ranch outside of town. Aaron Behrens, front man for Austin-based music group Ghostland Observatory.

Politics

See also

 Adelsverein
 German Texan
 List of museums in Central Texas
 National Register of Historic Places listings in San Saba County, Texas
 Recorded Texas Historic Landmarks in San Saba County

References

External links

 
San Saba County government’s website

Texas Beyond History, Mission San Saba

Further reading
 Hall, Sarah Harkey Surviving on the Texas Frontier The Journal of a Frontier Orphan Girl in San Saba County. Eakin Press, Austin, 1990. 

 
1856 establishments in Texas
Texas Hill Country
Populated places established in 1856